Heaven & Hell, released in 1997, is the 13th studio album by Joe Jackson, a musical interpretation and song cycle representing the seven deadly sins.

Billed to Joe Jackson & Friends; the friends included vocalists Dawn Upshaw ("Angel (Lust)"), Joy Askew ("Tuzla (Avarice)"), Suzanne Vega ("Angel (Lust)"), Brad Roberts from the Crash Test Dummies ("Passacaglia/A Bud and a Slice (Sloth)"), Jane Siberry ("The Bridge (Envy)"); and violinist Nadja Salerno-Sonnenberg ("Prelude", "Fugue 2/Song of Daedalus (Pride)").

This album was subsequently performed on tour with Jackson on piano, accordion and melodica, Valerie Vigoda on violin and vocals, and Elise Morris on keyboards, glockenspiel and vocals. The drums were programmed with the exception of "Right (Anger)" - which had drummers Dan Hickey and Kenny Aronoff drumming on opposite speakers through most of the song, and Jared Crawford of the musical Stomp playing plastic buckets in Times Square during the bridge..

Dramatic adaptation
In Boston in 2007, the album was adapted into a jukebox musical under the name Heaven & Hell: The Fantastical Temptation of the 7 Deadly Sins, with the script written by Jason Slavick.  The play followed the album's track listing, with each vice presented through a mixture of dance and a representation of each sin in daily life. Heaven & Hell had a five-day run at the Boston Conservatory.

Track listing
All songs written and arranged by Joe Jackson.

Personnel 
 Musicians
 Joe Jackson – piano, bongos on "Prelude", vocals on "Fugue 1/More is More", "Passacaglia/A Bud and a Slice" and "Fugue 2/Song of Daedalus", voice of Soul in Torment on "Angel", voices of Cynicism and Greed on "Tuzla"
 Nadja Salerno-Sonnenberg – solo violin on "Prelude" and on "Fugue 2/Song of Daedalus"
 Dawn Upshaw – voice of Angel on "Angel", voice of Forgetfulness on "Tuzla"
 Suzanne Vega – voice of Fallen Angel on "Angel"
 Mary Rowell – violin on "Angel"
 Allison Cornell – viola on "Angel"
 Sue Hadjopoulos – congas and bongos on "Angel" and on "The Bridge"
 Joy Askew – voice of Conscience on "Tuzla"
 Brad Roberts – vocals on "Passacaglia/A Bud and a Slice"
 Judith LeClair – bassoon on "Passacaglia/A Bud and a Slice"
 Dan Hickey – drums (left) on "Right"
 Kenny Aronoff – drums (right) on "Right"
 Jared Crawford – plastic buckets on Times Square
 Jane Siberry – vocals on "The Bridge"
 Mary Rowell, Laura Seaton, Sandra Park, Joyce Hammann, Todd Reynolds, Mark Feldman, Naomi Katz, Cenovia Cummins, James Tsao – violins
 Juliet Haffner, Allison Cornell, David Blinn, Katherine Beeson, Mary Rowell – violas
 Erik Friedlander, Stephanie Cummins, Richard Locker – cellos
 William Sloat – acoustic bass

 Production
 Joe Jackson – arrangements, producer, art direction, photography
 Ed Roynesdal – co-producer
 Dan Gellert  – recording engineer
 Rich Alvy – assistant recording engineer
 Ted Jensen – mastering engineer
 Mary Rowell – string section coordination
 P.R. Brown – art direction
 Jana Leön – photography

Charts

References

External links 
 Heaven & Hell album information at The Joe Jackson Archive

1997 albums
Joe Jackson (musician) albums
Concept albums
Sony Classical Records albums